Russell County School District is a school district in Russell County, Alabama.

Notable alumni
Colby Rasmus, Major League Baseball outfielder for the Tampa Bay Rays
Cory Rasmus, Major League Baseball relief pitcher

References

External links
 

Education in Russell County, Alabama